Windsor Racecourse, also known as Royal Windsor Racecourse, is a thoroughbred horse racing venue located in Windsor, Berkshire, England.  It is one of only two figure-of-eight courses in the United Kingdom, the other being at Fontwell Park.

Description
Windsor Racecourse is located on the banks of the River Thames and occupies a large island between the main channel of the River and the Clewer Mill Stream backwater.

Although the course is shaped like a figure-of-eight, the full circuit is never used, so in races of 1m, 1m 2f and 1m 3f 99y (the longest distance at Windsor) the runners turn only right-handed. The full circuit is a little over 1m 4f, although it was about 1m 6f until the late 1970s. The 6f course is almost straight.

History
The local area has links to horse racing that date back to the time of Henry VIII, but the first race meeting at Royal Windsor did not take place until 1866.

It abandoned National Hunt jump racing in December 1998, switching entirely to Flat racing.  However, the course has occasionally held National Hunt meetings since, such as when it took over some of nearby Ascot's jump meetings during its refurbishment in the mid-2000s. In 1987 David Thompson acquired a majority interest in Windsor Racecourse and Richard Thompson became chairman from 1987 until the sale to arena leisure plc in 1999.

On 15 October 2012 jockey Richard Hughes won 7 races out of the 8 races on the day.

Notable races

Other events
Windsor Racecourse was the location for scenes in the film Last Orders.

Windsor Racecourse was also the location for the filming of Midsomer Murders Season 8 episode Bantling Boy.

For the 2012 Summer Olympics a temporary bridge linked the Racecourse with Dorney Lake, the rowing and canoeing venue. The Racecourse served as a pick-up and drop-off point for spectators travelling to and from Dorney Lake.

References

External links
Official website
Course guide on GG.COM
Course guide on At The Races
Official sponsor

 
Horse racing venues in England
Sports venues in Berkshire
Buildings and structures in Windsor, Berkshire
Sports venues completed in 1866
1866 establishments in England